Tom's Gang is a 1927 American silent Western film directed by Robert De Lacey and starring Tom Tyler, Sharon Lynn and Frankie Darro.

Cast
 Tom Tyler as Dave Collins 
 Sharon Lynn as Lucille Rogers 
 Frankie Darro as Spuds 
 Harry Woods as Bart Haywood 
 Frank Rice as Andy Barker 
 Barney Furey as Ray Foster 
 Thomas G. Lingham as George Daggett 
 Jack Anthony as Bill Grimshaw

References

Bibliography
 Langman, Larry. A Guide to Silent Westerns. Greenwood Publishing Group, 1992.

External links
 

1927 films
1927 Western (genre) films
Films directed by Robert De Lacey
American black-and-white films
Film Booking Offices of America films
Silent American Western (genre) films
1920s English-language films
1920s American films